William Charles Angwin (13 March 1891 – 4 August 1963) was an Australian rules footballer who played in the Victorian Football League (VFL). Angwin played three games for Melbourne early in the 1913 VFL season before switching to St Kilda later in the season, playing six games and kicking one goal in the year and a half he was at the club. The one goal that Angwin kicked for his career was the winning goal in a match against Essendon. Angwin was a former Port Melbourne Railway United player who also played in Western Australia before his VFL career.

References

External links
DemonWiki profile

1891 births
1963 deaths
Australian rules footballers from Victoria (Australia)
Melbourne Football Club players
St Kilda Football Club players